Jean-Louis Idiart (3 May 1950 – 30 November 2022) was a French politician who was a member of the National Assembly of France. He represented the 8th constituency of the Haute-Garonne department
from 1993 to 2012
and was a member of the Socialiste, radical, citoyen et divers gauche.

Idiart died on 30 November 2022, at the age of 72.

References 

1950 births
2022 deaths
People from Haute-Garonne
Politicians from Occitania (administrative region)
Socialist Party (France) politicians
Members of Parliament for Haute-Garonne
Deputies of the 10th National Assembly of the French Fifth Republic
Deputies of the 11th National Assembly of the French Fifth Republic
Deputies of the 12th National Assembly of the French Fifth Republic
Deputies of the 13th National Assembly of the French Fifth Republic
Chevaliers of the Légion d'honneur